Lake Orel is a large freshwater lake in Khabarovsk Krai, Russia. It has an area of 314 km2 and a maximum depth of 3.8 m. It is located near the left bank of the Amur River, close from its mouth.

References

Orel